Kasper Kristensen (born 27 March 1986) is a Danish professional football midfielder, who currently plays for Hvidovre IF. He is the younger brother of FC København player Thomas Kristensen.

External links
AB profile
National team profile
Career statistics at Danmarks Radio

1986 births
Living people
Danish men's footballers
Lyngby Boldklub players
Brønshøj Boldklub players
Danish Superliga players
Association football midfielders